Paul Ch'eng Shih-kuang (15 September 1915 – 23 August 2012) was a Taiwanese prelate of the Roman Catholic Church.

Shih-kuang was born in Hsiao-Yi, Taiwan in the fall of 1915 and was ordained a priest 29 June 1943. Shih-kuang was appointed an Auxiliary Bishop for the Taipei Archdiocese on 3 May 1960 as well as Titular Bishop of Uccula and ordained bishop on 25 July 1960. He was appointed bishop of Diocese of Tainan on 7 June 1966 and remained in the position until his retirement 3 December 1990.

External links
Paul Ch'eng Shih-kuang

1915 births
2012 deaths
20th-century Roman Catholic bishops in Taiwan
Participants in the Second Vatican Council
Taiwanese people from Shanxi